Viktoria Georgievna Trykina (born 9 May 2001) is a Russian artistic gymnast. She is a 2017 Russian balance-beam champion (tied for first place with Seda Tutkhalian), and the 2018 Russian vault champion.

References

External links 
 Viktoria Trykina profile on the Artistic Gymnastics Federation of Russia website 

2001 births
Living people
Russian female artistic gymnasts
Gymnasts from Moscow
21st-century Russian women